The Sipakapense are one of the Maya peoples in Guatemala. They speak the Mayan Sipakapense language.

Notes

Indigenous peoples in Guatemala
Maya peoples of Guatemala
Mesoamerican cultures